The current one leu banknote is the smallest circulating denomination of the Romanian leu. It is the same size as the 5 Euro banknote.

The main color of the current banknote is green. It pictures, on the obverse Prime-minister and historian Nicolae Iorga, and on the reverse the Curtea de Argeş Cathedral, which suffered a massive restoration under his Government, and a crossed eagle, the Wallachian traditional heraldic element.

History 
In the past, the denomination was also in the coin form, as follows:

First leu (1867-1947)
 coin issues: 1870, 1873 (re-issues: 1874, 1876), 1881, 1884 (re-issue: 1885), 1894 (re-issues: 1900, 1901), 1906 (gold, celebration issue), 1910 (re-issues: 1911, 1912, 1914)
 banknote issue: 1915 (re-issues: 1920, 1937, 1938), 1917 (issued by the Romanian General Bank and circulated in the German occupation area between 1917-1918)
 coin issue: 1924
 banknote re-issue: 1938 (re-issue of the 1915 design)
 coin issue: 1938 (re-issues: 1939, 1940, 1941)
 banknote issue: 1941 (issued by INFINEX and circulated in Romanian administrated Transnistria between 1941-1944)

Second leu (1947-1952)
 coin issues: 1947, 1949 (re-issues: 1950, 1951)

Third leu - ROL(1952-2005)
 banknote issue: 1952
 coin issue: 1963 
 banknote issue: 1966
 coin issues: 1966 (actually minted in 1967, re-issue of the 1963 design), 1992, 1993 (re-issues: 1994, 1995, 1996)

Fourth leu - RON (since 2005)
 banknote issue: 2005 (redesigned issue of the former 10.000 lei banknote, whereas 10.000 third lei = 1 fourth leu)

References 
National Bank of Romania website

Banknotes of Romania
One-base-unit banknotes